Tajug  is a pyramidal or pyramid square (i.e. an equilateral square base with a peak) ornament which is usually used for sacred buildings in Southeast Asia including Indonesia, such as mosque or cupola graveyard. It is considered derived from Indian and Chinese architecture, which has history since pre-Islamic era, although there's also an element of an influence from Indian mosques. The term tajug is also used to refer to mosques or surau (Islamic assembly building) in some regions of Indonesia.

See also

Indonesian mosques

References

Islamic architectural elements
Islamic architecture
Architecture in Indonesia
Javanese architecture
Architectural elements
Ornaments (architecture)